Severodvinsk is a city in the north of Arkhangelsk Oblast, Russia, located in the delta of the Northern Dvina,  west of Arkhangelsk, the administrative center of the oblast. As of the 2021 Census, the population was 157,213. Due to the presence of important military shipyards (specialising in submarines since the Soviet period), Severodvinsk is an access-restricted town for foreign citizens. A special permit is required.

It was previously known as Sudostroy (until 1938), and Molotovsk (until 1957).

History

Pre-20th century 
Vikings explored the territories around the North Dvina River - part of Bjarmaland - at the start of the second millennium. British and Norman ships came to these places for mining, fur and fishing before the 13th century, but later the climate became colder and access to the northern seas became closed.

The historical records first mention the settlement on the site of modern Severodvinsk in 1419, when the Swedes sailed into the bay and burnt down the Nikolo-Korelsky Monastery that stood by the shore during the Swedish–Novgorodian Wars. Tradition states that Saint Euphemius, an Orthodox missionary in Karelia, founded this monastery. The abbey stood in ruins until 1471, when two sons of Marfa Boretskaya died in a vicious storm; their bodies were recovered on the beach near the monastery twelve days later. At the urging of Boretskaya, the monastery was restored and her sons were buried there.

On August 24, 1553, a ship of Richard Chancellor reached the salt-mining settlement of Nyonoksa, which is still famous for its traditional wooden architecture. The British sailors visited the Nikolo-Korelsky Monastery, where they were surprised to find a community of "sailors in soutanes (cassocks)" and a pier large enough to accommodate several ships. The main church of this extraordinary establishment was dedicated to Saint Nicholas, the holy patron of sailors; hence, the whole White Sea became known in 16th-century English maps as "St. Nicholas Bay". In late 1613, during the Time of Troubles in Russia, Polish-Lithuanian vagabonds, the Lisowczycy, captured and looted Severodvinsk with the monastery.

The Nikolo-Korelsky Monastery flourished after the establishment of the Muscovy Company, as the bulk of their trade passed through the local harbor. In August 1618 the harbour was visited by John Tradescant the elder, who conducted a survey of an island situated opposite the monastery. This island became known to the British as "Rose Island", because it was there that Tradescant found an exceedingly rare plant which he named "Rosa moscovita" (which is now known as Rosa acicularis) and brought back to London.

The surviving buildings of the monastery were constructed at the close of the Muscovite period. The five-domed cathedral of St. Nicholas was built between 1670 and 1674, preceded by the Assumption church (1664–1667), to which it is joined by a gallery. Several decades later, the walls and towers were built of timber; the Soviets transported the best-preserved of these towers to Kolomenskoye, Moscow, where it still remains.

Modern city
Severodvinsk is the second-largest city in Arkhangelsk Oblast. Its main industry remains defense-related — the construction and repair of submarines at the huge Northern Machine-building Enterprise SEVMASH (Северное Машиностроительное Предприятие-СЕВМАШ). The Soviet Union's first nuclear submarine Leninsky Komsomol was built here in 1957. At the beginning of the 1980s the world's largest submarine, a Typhoon class, was also built here, later recorded in the Guinness Book of World Records.

The modern city of Severodvinsk developed in the Soviet period. As it began to be built it was called Sudostroy ( - "Boat-build"). It received town status in 1938 and until 1957 was named Molotovsk, after Vyacheslav Molotov. On September 12, 1957 it was renamed Severodvinsk (meaning "Northern Dvina town").

During World War II a significant portion of the materials delivered by the Arctic Convoys to Murmansk and Arkhangelsk for the Soviet Union were unloaded in Severodvinsk. For example, the Empire Elgar, a British heavy lift ship that arrived in Arkhangelsk with convoy PQ 16 and subsequently spent eight weeks unloading ships from the ill-fated convoy PQ 17.

A Russian naval-base supports the sea trials of nuclear submarines from the major submarine construction- (64.5817 N, 39.8307 E) and repair-facilities located in the area. In Soviet times the 17th-century buildings of the Nikolo-Korelsky monastery, located on the territory of the shipyard, were adapted and used for shipbuilding purposes.  In recent years the monastery buildings, specifically the main church, have been restored and re-consecrated.  Church-goers attending services have to be shipyard workers or able to obtain a pass to enter the church portion of the shipyard.

Severodvinsk is an access-restricted town for foreign citizens. A special pass is required.

On 8 August 2019 a nuclear accident took place on Russian Navy's Central Missile Range in Nyonoksa, 30 km to the west from Severodvinsk.

Administrative and municipal status
Within the framework of administrative divisions, it is, together with eleven rural localities, incorporated as the city of oblast significance of Severodvinsk—an administrative unit with the status equal to that of the districts. As a municipal division, the city of oblast significance of Severodvinsk is incorporated as Severodvinsk Urban Okrug.

Demographics
Population: 

From 1950 until 1990, high-tech industries generated demand for a considerable quantity of suitably qualified experts and workers which prompted growth in population. Since 1992, the population has declined due to economic crises and unemployment that has provoked significant migration from the city.

Geography

Location 
The city is located near the Nikolsky mouth of the Northern Dvina at its confluence with the White Sea, 35 km northwest of Arkhangelsk, administrative centre of the region.

It is due to the fact that in addition to the city of Severodvinsk a large forest area with its settlements (villages and dachas) to the south and west of the city is included in the boundaries of Severodvinsk Urban Okrug itself.

The city is located at a latitude of 64°34′N, which means that it is possible to observe the northern lights.

Climate 
Climate in Severodvinsk is subarctic according to the Köppen climate classification. Summers are cool and winters are very cold. The average winter temperature is lower than in the central, southern and even some northern (such as Saint-Petersburg) regions of the European part of Russia. In december the Sun rises after 9 am and sets before 4 pm. But from May 17 to July 27 white nights are observed in the city.

Economy

Industry

The main role of the city has been, and remains, the production and repair of submarines and military ships. During the Cold War, the city prospered, but with the decline and break-up of the Soviet Union and the end of the Cold War the city has declined. The city's large military enterprises have survived the economic crises of the 1990s and have adjusted to new economic conditions. Severodvinsk now has the largest shipbuilding yard in Russia for large ships (tankers, cargo ships).

Large and military factories
"SevMash"() or Northern Machine-building Enterprise
core line of business is the construction and repair of submarines and other naval ships, as well as civilian vessels and oil platforms
"Zvezdochka" ( ("Starlet"))
Repair of submarines, military and civil ships, construction of oil platforms and faceting of diamonds.
"Severny Reyd" (("Northern Raid"))
Manufacture of marine equipment.
"Arktika" ( ("Arctic"))
Manufacture of automated equipment.

Transportation
Severodvinsk is the terminal station of a railway line which splits off at Isakogorka station from the line connecting Moscow and Arkhangelsk.

The Kudemskaya narrow-gauge railway in 2010 has appeared in Forbes ranking, of 10 most beautiful railway routes of the world.

Sport
Sport teams representing Severodvinsk in city, regional and all-Russian competitions:
"Sevmash" (also represents Northern Machine-building Enterprise) - football, futsal, ice hockey, bandy, volleyball, floorball;
"Zvezdochka" (also represents "Zvezdochka" enterprise) - football, futsal, hockey, volleyball;
"Sever" - bandy.

Social sphere

Education

There are 32 middle schools of general education in Severodvinsk, including special schools for orphans and handicapped children; two musical schools and two art schools.

Secondary vocational education institutions
Technical College (part of the Northern (Arctic) Federal University since 2011)
Technical School of Construction, Design and Technology
Technical School of Shipbuilding and Engineering
Technical School of Shipbuilding and Ship Repair
Technical School of Social Infrastructure
Technical School of Wiring and Communication
College of Management and Information Technology
Branch of Arkhangelsk Medical College

Higher education institutions
The city hosts branches of the following institutions:
Northern (Arctic) Federal University (including Institute of Shipbuilding and Maritime Arctic Engineering (ISMART) and Institute of Humanities)
International Institute of Management (Arkhangelsk)
Moscow Modern Humanitarian Academy
Northwest Academy of the State Service (St. Petersburg)

Monuments

There are nearly twenty monuments and memorial complexes in the city, including:
a monument honoring the city founders on Pashaeva Square (a 30-meter sculpture);
a monument to the renowned Russian scientist Mikhail Lomonosov, who was born in the region. One of the city's central streets is named after him;
two monuments to Vladimir Lenin;
the city gate, on the road from Arkhangelsk;
a monument to the home front workers of World War II;
military memorial complex on Yagry island which includes monument to World War II participants "The Grieving Motherland", monuments to the victims of the Kursk submarine disaster and the liquidators of the Chernobyl disaster.

Cultural heritage

Fifteen objects in Severodvinsk are protected as cultural heritage monuments In particular, the Nyonokotsky Pogost in the village of Nyonoksa is protected as an architecture monument on the federal level. This is one of the few surviving triple wooden church ensembles, consisting of two churches (a bigger, not heated, church used in the summer, a smaller, heated church used in the winter) and a bell-tower. Nyonoksa was also notable for salt production.

In addition, the wooden Church Resurrection of Christ, currently located on Yagry Island in the northern part of Severodvinsk, was relocated there in 1990s and was the first religious building open in the city.

The stone church of St. Nicholas is located in the eastern portion of the SEVMASH Shipyard.  The church building is the last remnant of the Svyato-Nikolskoye Monastery which served as the gateway to the pilgrimage monastery on the Solovetskiy Islands from the 15th century.

City in culture
K-19: The Widowmaker
Nuclear underwater epic, film of Discovery Channel
Documentary film of Alexandr Ipatov, "Severodvinsk, a bird's-eye view" (Russian "Северодвинск, вид с высоты птичьего полёта")
Seven Days, Season 1, Episode 13, "Last Breath"

Notable people
Polina Agafonova, Russian figure skater, was born in Severodvinsk in 1996.
Svetlana Klyukina, Russian artistic gymnast and a member of Russian Olympic team on 2008 Summer Olympics, was born in Severodvinsk in 1989.
Marina Prusakova, widow of Lee Harvey Oswald, the assassin of US President John F. Kennedy in 1963, was born in Molotovsk in 1941.
Olga Rukavishnikova, Soviet athlete who mainly competed in the women's pentathlon event during her career, was born in Molotovsk in 1955.
Mikhail Suprun, Russian historian and professor of the Pomor State University named after M. V. Lomonosov, was born in Molotovsk in 1955.
Maria Kursova, professional chess player representing Armenia

Twin towns and sister cities

Severodvinsk is twinned with:
 Portsmouth, New Hampshire, United States
 Bryansk, Bryansk Oblast, Russia
 Mazyr, Belarus
 Sumy, Ukraine
 Tiraspol, Transnistria

References

Notes

Sources

External links
 Official website of Severodvinsk
 Unofficial website of Severodvinsk
 History of the Nikolo-Korelsky Monastery

Cities and towns in Arkhangelsk Oblast
Severodvinsk Urban Okrug
White Sea
Port cities and towns in Russia
Russian and Soviet Navy bases
Arctic convoys of World War II